The Minnesota Experimental City (MXC) was a proposed planned community to be located in northern Minnesota (near Swatara in Aitkin County).  Proposed and studied beginning in the 1960s, it would have been constructed as a public–private partnership.  In contrast with many of the model cities of the time, the MXC was to be experimental, trying new things rather than proposing to select from the best of the existing practice. The project was initiated and directed by renowned scientist and University of Minnesota dean Athelstan Spilhaus.

In the plan, only 1/6 of the area would be paved, the remainder would be open space: parks, wilderness, and farms. Under the influence of Buckminster Fuller who sat on the MXC's advisory board, the plan called for the MXC to be partially enclosed by a geodesic dome. It would contain a branch of the University of Minnesota and 3M Corporation.

Among other proposed features were: 
 a pedestrian zone, cars were to be parked on the edge with a people-mover connecting them to the center. An automated highway system would connect the town with the outside world.
 no schools. The city itself would foster lifelong learning, with everyone both a student and teacher.
 waterless toilets

See also 
 Epcot
 Arcosanti

References 
Spilhaus, Athelstan (1967) The Experimental City, in: Daedalus Vol. 96, No. 4, America's Changing Environment (Fall, 1967), pp. 1129–1141 (on JSTOR)
Vivrett, Walter K. (1971) Planning For People: Minnesota Experimental City, New Community Development Vol. 1: Planning, Process, Implementation, and Emerging Social Concerns, Shirley Weiss (Ed.). Chapel Hill: University of North Carolina, 1971.

External links 
 Swatara Minnesota History
 The Town of Swatara, Minnesota
 The Newest New Town
 Creating Future Learning Systems
 Minnesota Experimental City papers, N71, Northwest Architectural Archives, University of Minnesota Libraries, Minneapolis, MN.
 Minnesota Experimental City Authority Records, Minnesota Historical Society, State Archives, Saint Paul, MN.
 Documentary by Chad Freidrichs about MXC

History of Minnesota
Proposed populated places in the United States
Utopian communities in the United States